Kassina mertensi is a species of frog in the family Hyperoliidae. It is endemic to northeastern Democratic Republic of the Congo. The specific name mertensi honours Robert Mertens, a German zoologist and herpetologist. Common name Mertens' running frog has been coined for it.

Kassina mertensi might be conspecific with Kassina maculosa.

Kassina mertensi occurs clearings in rainforest as well as in heavily degraded former forest (farm bush). Threats to it are not known, but it appears to tolerate some habitat modification.

References

mertensi
Frogs of Africa
Amphibians of the Democratic Republic of the Congo
Endemic fauna of the Democratic Republic of the Congo
Amphibians described in 1952
Taxa named by Raymond Laurent
Taxonomy articles created by Polbot